Sven Pagel (born 25 June 1973 in Bonn) is a German professor for business informatics and media management. His research focuses on digital moving image communication in Internet media, UX and user research, and digital transformation. Since 2013 Pagel has been teaching at the University of Applied Sciences in Mainz.

Life 
After graduating from the Hardtberg Gymnasium in Bonn in 1992, Pagel began studying business administration at the Justus Liebig University in Giessen, majoring in business informatics, controlling and international companies, graduating in 1998. In parallel, he studied Business Organisation at Heriot-Watt University Edinburgh from 1994 to 1995 and at the University of Montpellier from 1996 to 1997. After completing his studies, Pagel was a lecturer in the business administration department in the IT division of ZDF in Mainz from 1998. After 2 years he became a freelancer for the digital bouquet at ZDFvision and moved to Südwestrundfunk in Mainz in 2002 as a consultant for online coordination. He also worked as a freelancer in service multimedia at ARTE in Strasbourg.

From 2000 to 2003 Pagel completed his doctorate at the Institute of Journalism at the University of Dortmund under Jürgen Heinrich. In 2004, Pagel became professor of business administration, in particular communication and multimedia, at the University of Applied Sciences in Düsseldorf. Since 2013, he has been professor of business informatics and media management at the University of Applied Sciences in Mainz.

Awards 

 2000: Karl-Holzamer scholarship of the ZDF, Mainz
 2000: Doctoral scholarship of the Foundation of the German Economy, Berlin
 1998: University Promotion Prize of the University of Giessen
 1995: Scholarship of the Friedrich Naumann Foundation, Potsdam

Bibliography

References

External links 

 Academic homepage

1973 births
Living people
Scientists from Bonn
Mass media scholars
Computer scientists
ZDF people
Academic staff of the University of Applied Sciences, Mainz